Acacia undulifolia is a shrub of the genus Acacia and the subgenus Phyllodineae that is endemic to eastern Australia.

Description
It usually has few main branches that are  erect to inclined and curved to straight. It has reddish-brown or sometimes green branchlets that are ridged and angled. Like most species of Acacia it has phyllodes rather than true leaves. They are green to grey-green or blue-green and slightly asymmetric and flat or sometimes convex or broadly elliptic in shape.

Taxonomy
The specific epithet is in reference to the undulate phyllodes, which is particularly noticeable on new growth. The plant resembles ''Acacia piligera.

Distribution
It is native to an area in New South Wales where it has a scattered distribution over the upper Blue Mountains from the north near Mount Monundilla to the south around the Megalong Valley and as far west as the Cox River extending to the east as far as the Watagan Range and Bucketty where it usually grows in gravelly sandy loam soils that have originated from sandstones.

See also
 List of Acacia species

References

undulifolia
Flora of New South Wales
Plants described in 1829
Taxa named by Allan Cunningham (botanist)